Blow Job is a silent film directed by Andy Warhol. It depicts the face of an uncredited DeVeren Bookwalter as he apparently receives fellatio from an unseen partner. While shot at 24 frames per second, Warhol specified that it should be projected at 16 frames per second, slowing it down by a third.

Despite the salacious title, the film shows only the expression on the young man's face; the implied sexual act itself is not seen. Whether it is a male or a female performing the act is not stated, and the viewer must assume that fellatio is occurring.  The salaciousness has also been speculated to be entirely in the title with no fellatio actually being performed.

Making
The identity of the person performing the act is disputed. Warhol states in his book Popism: The Warhol Sixties (1980) that five different boys performed the fellatio. In this book, Warhol writes that he originally asked Charles Rydell, the boyfriend of filmmaker Jerome Hill, to star in the film, promising that there would be "five beautiful boys" to perform the act.

However, when Warhol set up the film shoot at The Factory on a Sunday, Rydell failed to show up. Warhol phoned Rydell at Hill's suite at the Algonquin Hotel and asked where Rydell was. Rydell replied that he thought Warhol was kidding, and had no intention of appearing in such a film. When he declined, Andy used "a good-looking kid that happened to be hanging around the Factory that day", who was later identified as Bookwalter. By that time, the five boys had departed, but Warhol's notoriously poor memory kept the five boys in place for the version given in the much later book POPism.

Commentary
According to Peter Gidal, the film distances the viewer from the experience it purportedly depicts, "Sometimes the young actor looks bored, sometimes as if he is thinking, sometimes as if he is aware of the camera, sometimes as if he is not." Douglas Crimp states that after a few minutes, "it becomes clear that we will see nothing more than the repetition, with slight variations, of what we've already seen". This frees the mind to look in a different way. Likewise, the sexual act has the effect of distracting the actor from the presence of the camera, creating a unique kind of unself-consciousness. The film becomes "a lesson in how to produce a really beautiful portrait without saying 'cheese'!"

Critic Roy Grundmann argues that "Blow Job‘s self-reflexive devices create a new kind of spectatorial address that dislodges audiences from their contemplative positions in a number of ways. Blow Job‘s reflexivity makes spectators intensely aware that seeing a film makes projecting onto and investing into an image a part of oneself which is also a socialized acculturated act". Grundmann further claims that "viewers oscillate between an awareness of their contingency on larger scheme and the promise of ocularcentric mastery of the image".

Sequel: Eating Too Fast

In 1966, Warhol filmed a sequel, Eating Too Fast (originally titled Blow Job #2) which runs 67 minutes with sound. It features art critic and writer Gregory Battcock as the recipient.

See also

 Andy Warhol filmography
 Beautiful Agony
 Blue Movie (1969) – Warhol film
 Eat (1964) – Warhol film
 Eating Too Fast (1966) – Warhol film
 Erotic art
 Erotic photography
 Golden Age of Porn (1969–1984)
 Kiss (1963) – Warhol film
 List of American films of 1964
 Sleep (1964) – Warhol film
 Unsimulated sex

References

External links

WarholStars.org website: Blow Job page

Further reading
Gidal, Peter. Andy Warhol's Blow Job. London: Afterall Books, 2008.

1964 short films
1964 films
American short documentary films
American LGBT-related short films
American silent short films
American black-and-white films
Fellatio
Films directed by Andy Warhol
One-shot films
American independent films
1964 LGBT-related films
1960s American films